Mehdiabad-e Moaven (also Romanized as Mehdīābād-e Mo‘āven; also known as Mehdīābād) is a village in Azadegan Rural District, in the Central District of Rafsanjan County, Kerman Province, Iran. At the 2006 census, its population was 203, in 38 families.

References 

Populated places in Rafsanjan County